Thyreus shebicus is a species of cleptoparisitic bee belonging to the genus Thyreus and the family Apidae. It is found in northern Yemen and southwestern Saudi Arabia

References 

Apinae
Taxa named by Michael S. Engel